Samuel Anim Addo (born July 31, 1976) is a Ghanaian football agent and chairman of Okwawu United S.C. He was elected an executive committee member of the Ghana Football Association in 2019 

At the Ghana Football Association, Anim Addo is the Chairman of the Ghana National U-15 Team, and the Vice Chairman of the Ghana Olympic Team (National U-23), the Black Meteors.

References

1976 births
Living people
People from Accra
Ghanaian football chairmen and investors